Sainte-Agathe-la-Bouteresse is a commune in the Loire department in central France.

Geography
The river Lignon du Forez flows through the commune.

Population

See also
Communes of the Loire department

References

Sainteagathelabouteresse